Justin Rogers (born August 31, 1983 in Penngrove, California) is a former American football linebacker in the National Football League for the New England Patriots, Dallas Cowboys and Kansas City Chiefs. He played college football at Southern Methodist University.

Early years
Rogers grew up in Commerce, Texas and attended Commerce High School. He was a two-time All-district selection. He contributed to the team winning the 3A state championship in 1999 and 2001.

He also practiced baseball, basketball and track. He was an All-district selection in baseball as a senior.

College career
Rogers accepted a football scholarship from Southern Methodist University. As a redshirt freshman, he appeared in all 12 games (2 starts) as a backup defensive end, making 34 tackles.

As a sophomore, he started 9 games at defensive end, registering 27 tackles (5.5 for loss) and tying the team lead with 2.5 sacks.

As a junior, he led the conference in sacks (7) and ranked in the top 10 in tackles-for-loss and forced fumbles. He posted 64 tackles (10.5 for loss) and 3 forced fumbles. 

His senior season was cut short with a neck injury, but he still was able to lead the team with 9.5 sacks. He also had 59 tackles (15 for loss).

Rogers finished his college career after starting 33 out of 43 games, while recording 184 tackles (32 for loss), 19.5 sacks (second in school history), 5 forced fumbles and one blocked kick.

Pre-Draft
At his Pro Day, Rogers measured in at 6'3" 252 pounds. He ran a 4.76 40 yard dash (1.58 10 yard split) with a 4.28 20 yard shuttle and 7.32 3 cone time. He had a vertical jump of 34" and a broad jump of 9'9" and bench pressed 225 pounds 19 times.

Professional career

New England Patriots
Rogers was selected by the New England Patriots in the sixth round (180th overall) of the 2007 NFL Draft, with the intention of converting him into an outside linebacker. He became the first Mustang drafted by an NFL team since Kevin Garrett in 2003. He was waived by the Patriots during final cuts on September 1.

Dallas Cowboys
On September 2, 2007, he was claimed off waivers by the Dallas Cowboys. He played in all 16 games primarily on special teams. He finished the season with 16 special teams tackles (fifth on the team) as well as three tackles on defense.

In 2008, Rogers played in 15 games, finishing third on the team with 18 special teams tackles.

He missed time in the 2009 training camp with tendinitis in his knee. On August 2, he was waived/injured and subsequently reverted to the injured reserve list. He was released on August 27.

Kansas City Chiefs
On October 14, 2009, he was signed by the Kansas City Chiefs. He was waived three days later, and re-signed on October 20. He appeared in one game and was declared inactive in five games. He was placed on the injured reserve list with a thigh injury on December 26. He was waived on February 8, 2010.

References

External links
Former Mustang football player experiencing NFL

1983 births
Living people
People from Penngrove, California
People from Commerce, Texas
Players of American football from California
Players of American football from Texas
American football defensive ends
American football linebackers
SMU Mustangs football players
Sportspeople from the Dallas–Fort Worth metroplex
Sportspeople from the San Francisco Bay Area
New England Patriots players
Dallas Cowboys players
Kansas City Chiefs players